Hechtia elliptica is a plant species in the genus Hechtia. This species is endemic to Mexico.

References

elliptica
Endemic flora of Mexico